"Hats Off to Larry" is a song written and sung by Del Shannon, which he released as a single in 1961. The song spent 13 weeks on the Billboard Hot 100 chart, peaking at No. 5, while reaching No. 1 on Canada's CHUM Hit Parade, No. 2 on New Zealand's "Lever Hit Parade", No. 2 in Australia, No. 6 on the UK's Record Retailer chart, and No. 8 in South Africa.

The song was ranked No. 68 on Billboards end of year "Hot 100 for 1961 - Top Sides of the Year" and No. 35 on Cash Boxs "Top 100 Chart Hits of 1961".

Chart performance

References

1961 songs
1961 singles
Del Shannon songs
Songs written by Del Shannon